Independence Cup may refer to the following football competitions:

 Independence Cup (Albania), held annually from 2009
 Armenian Cup, held annually from 1992
 Independence Cup (Bangladesh), held annually from 2005
 Brazil Independence Cup, held in 1972 to commemorate the 150th anniversary of the Brazilian Declaration of Independence
 Indonesian Independence Cup, held ten times intermittently since 1985
 Lesotho Independence Cup, held annually from 1985
 Independence Cup (Malta), held annually from 1965, though not in 1967–1968 and parts of the 1970s and '80s
 Zambian Cup, an annual competition called the Independence Cup from 1975 to 1992

See also
 1997 Pepsi Independence Cup, a quadrangular ODI cricket tournament commemorating the 50th anniversary of the independence of India
 1998 Silver Jubilee Independence Cup, a One Day International cricket tournament celebrating the 25th anniversary of Bangladesh's independence
 2017 Independence Cup (cricket), a Twenty20 International cricket tournament in Pakistan